The Ponte di Pioraco is a Roman bridge in Pioraco, central Italy, presumably erected under emperor Augustus (r. 30 BC–14 AD).

It belonged to a branch road of the Via Flaminia, which ran from Nocera Umbra to the east through Pioraco, San Severino, Treia and Osimo to Ancona. The structure has a single arch vault. At one end a small segmental arch springs from the ground to the quarter point of the main arch; it worked as a floodway. The Ponte del Gran Caso, which is also located in central Italy, features a similar design.

See also 
 List of Roman bridges
 Roman architecture
 Roman engineering

References

Sources

External links 
Picture of the bridge

Roman bridges in Italy
Deck arch bridges
Stone bridges in Italy
Buildings and structures in le Marche
Transport in le Marche

